The Light flyweight competition at the 2015 AIBA World Boxing Championships will be held from 5–18 October 2015. This is a qualifying tournament for the upcoming 2016 Summer Olympics. Joahnys Argilagos of Cuba defeated Vasily Yegorov of Russia to win the world title.

Medalists

Seeds

  Joselito Velázquez (round of 16)
  Hasanboy Dusmatov (round of 16)
  Joahnys Argilagos
  Vasilii Egorov

Draw

Finals

Section 1

Section 2

Results

Ranking

References

External links
Draw Sheet

2015 AIBA World Boxing Championships